Keshavapuram is a village and Gram panchayat of Nalgonda mandal, Nalgonda district, in Telangana state.

Religion

Churches
St.James Church Puthenkadai

References

Villages in Nalgonda district